Omran Daqneesh (born 2011) is a Syrian boy who, at age five, gained media attention after footage of him injured appeared on the Internet following a reported air strike.

History
Daqneesh was injured on August 17, 2016, in an alleged Russian Air Force strike on the rebel-held al-Qaterji neighbourhood of Aleppo, Syria. Video footage from the Aleppo Media Centre showed an unarmed man, who appeared to be a rescue worker, carrying Omran from a damaged building to an ambulance. He was taken to a hospital known as M10, which was supported by the Syrian American Medical Society. A surgeon who treated Omran said there was "blood on his face from a wound on his forehead". A doctor said Omran was suffering from shock and required stitches for his head wound. Doctors found no apparent signs of brain injury, and he was discharged hours after being rescued. 

In August 2016, Omran's relatives said they were afraid of government reprisals and declined to speak. After his family crossed into government-controlled territory, Omran's father was interviewed by Iran's Al-Alam News Network in 2017. His father said Omran only suffered minor injuries and was taken to the hospital needlessly after "gunmen" took him to an ambulance. His father said the blood on Omran's face came from his own wounds, which dripped onto Omran.  

Daqneesh was rescued with his parents and three siblings, then aged one, six, and ten. His ten-year-old brother, Ali, died on August 20, 2016, of his injuries. The apartment building collapsed shortly after the family was rescued. Eight people died in the air strike, including five children. The footage was released by the Aleppo Media Centre, a Syrian opposition activist group. Photojournalist Mahmoud Raslan, who photographed Daqneesh, and journalist Mustafa al-Sarout,  who filmed him, both spoke to Western media about the iconic photo. Russia Today interviewed Sara Flounders of the International Action Center who said that Raslan's social media suggested previous support for rebel group Nour al-Din al-Zenki Movement.

The image of him sitting bloodied in an ambulance after being dragged from the rubble of his home caused international outrage and was widely featured in newspapers and social media. It has been compared with photographs of Alan Kurdi, a child refugee of the Syrian Civil War who drowned trying to reach Europe. On Swiss television, Syrian President Bashar al-Assad said the image of Omran was "a forged picture, not a real one".

In June 2017, new photos and videos of the boy emerged from Syrian government media. In an interview with Kinana Alloush, a presenter for Syrian state TV, Omran's father said that his son had been used as a 'propaganda tool' by rebel forces, and that the family had always been pro-government. His father also criticized rebel groups in Aleppo for attempting to exploit his family as propaganda to push for regime-change.

See also 
 Death of Alan Kurdi
 Death of Hamza Ali Al-Khateeb
 Refugees of the Syrian Civil War

References

Further reading
 

Syrian children
People of the Syrian civil war
Living people
2011 births